Ledet House is a historic residence located at 2117 LA 308, about  west of Raceland, Louisiana.

Built in c.1870, the house is a one-story framed cottage in Greek Revival style. The property on which the house stands was bought by Paulin A. Ledet  and Joachim Prosper Ledet in 1876 from Leon Falgout.

The house was added to the National Register of Historic Places on May 23, 1997.

See also
 National Register of Historic Places listings in Lafourche Parish, Louisiana

References

Houses on the National Register of Historic Places in Louisiana
Greek Revival architecture in Louisiana
Houses completed in 1870
Houses in Lafourche Parish, Louisiana
National Register of Historic Places in Lafourche Parish, Louisiana